Memories of a Mexican is a 1950 Mexican documentary film directed by Salvador Toscano and Carmen Toscano. It was entered into the 1954 Cannes Film Festival. The film was preserved by the Academy Film Archive in 2012.

References

External links

1950 films
1950 documentary films
1950s Spanish-language films
Mexican documentary films
Films directed by Salvador Toscano
Mexican black-and-white films
1950s Mexican films